The 2013–14 Hampton Pirates men's basketball team represented Hampton University during the 2013–14 NCAA Division I men's basketball season. The Pirates, led by fifth year head coach Edward Joyner, played their home games at the Hampton Convocation Center and were members of the Mid-Eastern Athletic Conference. They finished the season 18–13, 13–3 in MEAC play to finish in second place. They lost in the quarterfinals of the MEAC tournament to Coppin State. They were invited to the College Basketball Invitational where they lost in the first round to Penn State.

Roster

Schedule

|-
!colspan=9 style="background:#00216E; color:#FFFFFF;"| Regular season

|-
!colspan=9 style="background:#00216E; color:#FFFFFF;"| MEAC tournament

|-
!colspan=9 style="background:#00216E; color:#FFFFFF;"| CBI

References

Hampton Pirates men's basketball seasons
Hampton
Hampton
Hampton Pirates men's basketball
Hampton Pirates men's basketball